ECP may refer to:

Military
Early Commissioning Program, a United States Army ROTC program offered by Military Junior College
Entry Control Point, an established entry and exit point that is a part of layered security used to gain access to Forward Operating Bases (FOBs).

Organizations
 École Centrale Paris, a French university
 Emerging Capital Partners, a private equity firm
 English College in Prague, a Czech high school
 English Collective of Prostitutes, a feminist group
 Episcopal Church in the Philippines, an autocephalous province of the Anglican Communion in the Philippines

 European Committee for the Prevention of Torture
 Evangelical Churches of Pentecost, a Pentecostal denomination which merged with the Apostolic Churches of Pentecost

Science and technology
 Effective Core Potential, a term in computational chemistry
 Electrochemical corrosion potential, an electrode potential with a non-zero net reaction on the working electrode but zero net current
 Electrochemical potential, a thermodynamic measure of chemical potential that includes the energy contribution of electrostatics
 Eastman Color Positive, a photographic processing system 
 Electronic Communications in Probability, a scientific journal

 Engineering Change Proposal, see Beretta APX
 Enhanced Content Protection, see MovieLabs

Computing
 Electronic Check Processing, in electronic banking
 Extended Capability Port, an IEEE 1284 parallel port mode 
 Equivalence class partitioning, a software testing technique
 Exascale Computing Project, a U.S. project to accelerate an exascale computing ecosystem
 Excessive crossposts, a form of Usenet spam, see also Breidbart Index

Medicine
 Eosinophil cationic protein, a basic protein in the eosinophil primary matrix, encoded in humans by the RNASE3 gene
 Emergency Care Practitioner, a type of paramedic or nurse
 Emergency contraceptive pill, a type of contraception also known as morning-after pill
 Endoscopic CycloPhotocoagulation, a minimally invasive treatment for the management of glaucoma
 Extracorporeal photopheresis, a therapy in which blood is treated with a photosensitizing agent and subsequently irradiated with light
 External counterpulsation, a non-invasive therapy used to treat chronic angina and other ischemic heart diseases
 Eye Care Professional, an individual who provides a service related to the eyes or vision
 European Certificate of Psychotherapy, awarded by the European Association for Psychotherapy

Transportation
 Northwest Florida Beaches International Airport (IATA: ECP), near Panama City Beach, Florida, US
 East Coast Parkway, a major highway in the south-east of Singapore
 Electronically controlled pneumatic brakes, a type of railway brake

Other uses
 Economic calculation problem, an economic term that refers to fallacies in economic planning
 Election Commission of Pakistan
 Empty category principle, a syntactic constraint in theoretical linguistics
 Extreme corporal punishment, a fictional English band in the movie SLC Punk!